The Pueblo of Acoma is an Indian reservation of the Acoma Pueblo peoples located in parts of Cibola, Socorro, and Catron counties, in New Mexico, the Southwestern United States. It covers 594.996 sq mi (1,541.033 km²). The reservation borders the Laguna Indian Reservation to the east and is near El Malpais National Monument due west.

The total number of tribal members is about 6,000. 2,802 people were living on the reservation's lands, as reported in the 2000 census.

Acoma Pueblo

The Acoma Pueblo is the heart of the reservation and is held as one of the oldest continuously inhabited places in the United States.

Communities
Acomita Lake
North Acomita Village
Skyline-Ganipa

See also
 List of Indian reservations in New Mexico
 List of Indian reservations in the United States

References

External links
Pueblo of Acoma
Acoma Pueblo and Off-Reservation Trust Land, New Mexico United States Census Bureau

American Indian reservations in New Mexico
Catron County, New Mexico
Cibola County, New Mexico
Socorro County, New Mexico